Fire Station No. 10 is a fire station located at 7247 S Park Avenue in Tacoma, Washington. The station was designed by architect Morton J. Nicholson and built by Martin H. Marker in 1928. It was listed on the National Register of Historic Places on May 2, 1986, as part of a thematic resource, "Historic Fire Stations of Tacoma, Washington".

See also
 Historic preservation
 National Register of Historic Places listings in Pierce County, Washington

References

External links
 

1928 establishments in Washington (state)
Buildings and structures in Tacoma, Washington
Bungalow architecture in Washington (state)
Fire stations completed in 1928
Fire stations on the National Register of Historic Places in Washington (state)
National Register of Historic Places in Tacoma, Washington